João Vasco Paiva (born 1979, Coimbra, Portugal) is a Hong Kong-based contemporary artist.

Biography
João Vasco Paiva received a BFA from the Escola Superior Artistica do Porto in 2004 and an MFA in Creative Media from the City University of Hong Kong in 2008. He is the recipient of the Hong Kong Emerging Artist Grant and the Calouste Gulbenkian Foundation’s International Artist Support Grant amongst other awards, and has held residencies at Lichtenberg Studios, Berlin (2014) and Connecting Space, Zurich (2015).

Paiva is represented by Lehmann + Silva and currently resides between Lisbon and Hong Kong.

Work

Often contrasting the institutional space against the neglected urban space, Paiva addresses the notion of “non-places” as conceived by anthropologist Marc Augé, fleshing out the semantics each structure may possess. His practice involves systematically documenting, analysing and abstracting them to create a process-driven composition that is simultaneously an artwork, which ultimately explores how urban spaces may evoke aesthetic production as well as informative truths.

Though intrinsically tied to Hong Kong, Paiva’s work has been exhibited widely at the Witte de With, Rotterdam; Artsonje, Seoul; OCT Contemporary Art Terminal, Shanghai; Orient Foundation, Macau and Counter Space, Zurich amongst other locations.

In 2015, Paiva’s installation ‘Mausoleum’ (2015) – a towering composition of marketplace Styrofoam boxes cast in stone resin – was selected for the Encounters section of Art Basel Hong Kong. In 2015-16, he presented ‘Unlimited’, a project and citywide installation in collaboration with Edouard Malingue Gallery at Media Art Asia Pacific in Brisbane. Other notable exhibitions in recent years include ‘Benches, Stairs, Ramps, Ledges, Ground’ in Jacob Lewis Gallery, New York (2016) and ‘CARGO’ at the National Museum of Contemporary Art Museu do Chiado, Lisbon (2016).

Solo exhibitions

 2016 - Benches, Stairs, Ramps, Ledges, Ground, Jacob Lewis Gallery, New York, USA
 2016 - CARGO, National Museum of Contemporary Art Museu do Chiado, Lisbon, Portugal
 2015 - Unlimited, Media Art Asia Pacific, Brisbane, Australia
 2015 - Mausoleum, Encounters, Art Basel Hong Kong, Hong Kong
 2015 - Counter Space, Zurich, Switzerland
 2014 - Cast Away, Casa Garden - Orient Foundation, Macao
 2013 - Near and Everywhere, Edouard Malingue Gallery, Hong Kong
 2013 - Objects Encrypted, Goethe Institute, Hong Kong
 2011 - Palimpseptic, Saamlung Gallery, Hong Kong
 2011 - Forced Empathy - Anchored Monument I, Experiments, Hong Kong
 2010 - Sea of Mountains, Para Site and Hanart TZ Gallery, Hong Kong
 2010 - Experiments on the Notation of Shapes, Input Output Gallery, Hong Kong
 2010 - Chirps, Fuses A.I.R., Videotage, Hong Kong

References

External links 
 Artist's website
 Video interview with João
 João Vasco Paiva Artsy Page
 João Vasco Paiva on Artnet
 João Vasco Paiva on Ocula
 JOÃO VASCO PAIVA: REIMAGINING TRANSITIONAL PLACES Video
 Edouard Malingue Gallery, Hong Kong gallery representing João Vasco Paiva

Hong Kong artists
Living people
1979 births